Derek James Statham (born 24 March 1959) is an English former footballer who played at defensive left-back. He played for West Bromwich Albion, Southampton, Walsall and Stoke City.

Statham won three international caps for England in 1983 under the management of Bobby Robson.

Career
Statham was born in Wolverhampton and began his career with West Bromwich Albion where he earned a reputation as a solid, classy defender with excellent passing ability. He made over 330 league and cup appearances for West Brom, playing for several years alongside Bryan Robson and the 'Three Degrees' of Cyrille Regis, Laurie Cunningham and Brendon Batson in an impressive side assembled by Ron Atkinson. In total Statham spent 12 years at the Hawthorns making 373 appearances for the club, scoring 11 goals in all competitions.

Statham left West Brom for Southampton in 1987, playing alongside a young Alan Shearer (in his first professional season) and Matthew Le Tissier, and was an immediate success winning the club's player of the season award for 1987–88. He stayed at Southampton for the 1988–89 season before joining Stoke City in August 1989. He played 21 times for Stoke in 1989–90 as the team suffered relegation to the Third Division. He played in 28 games in 1990–91 before being released at the end of the season.

He later played for Walsall, where he played his final professional game in the 1992–93 season. His last team were semi-professional side Telford United in the English Football Conference, where he was a mainstay for the 1993–94 season.

In 2004, he was named as one of West Bromwich Albion's 16 greatest ever players, in a poll organised as part of the club's 125th anniversary celebrations.

Career statistics

Club
Source:

A.  The "Other" column constitutes appearances and goals in the Football League Trophy, Full Members Cup, and UEFA Cup.

International
Source:

References

External links
 

Living people
1959 births
Footballers from Wolverhampton
English footballers
England international footballers
England B international footballers
England under-21 international footballers
West Bromwich Albion F.C. players
Southampton F.C. players
Walsall F.C. players
Stoke City F.C. players
Association football fullbacks
English Football League players
Telford United F.C. players